Tom Bowman is National Public Radio's Pentagon reporter, having been an investigative reporter for the Baltimore Sun for 19 years prior to that.

Education
He attended Saint Michael's College in Vermont, receiving a bachelor's degree in history, and then received a master's in American studies from Boston College.

Career
He became The Sun's military affairs correspondent in 1997, after having covered the U.S. Naval Academy in Annapolis and the National Security Agency. He has reported from Afghanistan and Iraq.

Bowman grew up in Boston. He started his newspaper career in 1976 as a stringer for The Patriot Ledger in Quincy, Massachusetts.

Personal life
Bowman presently lives in Alexandria, Virginia, with his wife Brigid Schulte, a Washington Post reporter, and their children, Liam and Tessa.

Awards
He received the 2006 National Headliners' Award for his coverage of the lack of advanced tourniquets for U.S. troops in Iraq.

References

External links 
 Tom Bowman, NPR Biography
 MilitaryReporters.org biography
 
 Bowman participates in panel discussion, The First 100 Days: What Challenges Face the New Commander-in-Chief? at the Pritzker Military Museum & Library on February 5, 2009

The Baltimore Sun people
NPR personalities
American newspaper reporters and correspondents
Morrissey College of Arts & Sciences alumni
Writers from Boston
Writers from Alexandria, Virginia
Year of birth missing (living people)
Living people
Journalists from Virginia
Place of birth missing (living people)